Bruce Charlesworth (born 1950) is an American artist, known primarily for his photographic, video and multimedia works.

Early life and education
Charlesworth was born in 1950 in Davenport, Iowa. He received his BA degree in Art from the University of Northern Iowa (1972) and his MFA degree in Painting from the University of Iowa in 1975.

Work
Charlesworth began to exhibit in New York and internationally with the photo-novellas Eddie Glove (1976–79), and Special Communiqués (1981). Other staged photographic series followed, including Trouble (1982–83), Fate (1984–87), Man and Nature (1988–91), Confiscated Objects (1999–2000), and Serum (2003–08).  

Surveillance (1981) was the first of many of what Charlesworth termed narrative environments, works that use video and/or audio to power a narrative within a designed space.  Projectile (1982), Wrong Adventures (1984), Private House (1987), Reality Street (1994) and Airlock (2004) are a few subsequent multimedia installations.  

Video and film works include Communiqués for Tape (1981), Robert and Roger (1985), Dateline for Danger (1987), A Stranger's Index (1990) and The Happiness Effect (2004).  Throughout much of the 1990s Charlesworth worked on his feature-length experimental film project Private Enemy - Public Eye.  In the book entitled, Private Enemy, Public Eye: The Work of Bruce Charlesworth (1989), was also the name of a survey exhibition of his work at the International Center of Photography. The interactive video installation Love Disorder was featured in the Zero1 Biennial (2008) in San Jose, California and in the Madison Museum of Contemporary Art's Wisconsin Triennial (2010). Love Disorder featured a 12 foot tall screen with an uncomfortably close view of a face, and sensors in the room would change how the face reacts to the viewers movements.

Exhibitions and collections 
Charlesworth's work has been shown at the Centre Georges Pompidou in Paris, London's Tate Gallery, The American Film Institute, the Whitney Museum of American Art, the National Museum of American Art in Washington, and the Museum of Contemporary Art in Chicago and many other museums and galleries.

His work is included in the permanent collections of the Metropolitan Museum of Art, the Walker Art Center in Minneapolis, and the Houston Museum of Fine Arts, among others.

Awards and honors
In 2007, he was awarded a Guggenheim Fellowship from the John Simon Guggenheim Memorial Foundation for his work in interactive video installation.

Charlesworth was the first artist-in-residence at the Capp Street Project in San Francisco in 1984.

References

Sources

External links

1950 births
American filmmakers
American installation artists
American multimedia artists
American performance artists
American photographers
American video artists
Living people
University of Iowa alumni
University of Northern Iowa alumni